The Notable Names Database (NNDB) is an online database of biographical details of over 40,000 people. Soylent Communications, a sole proprietorship that also hosted the now-defunct Rotten.com, describes NNDB as an "intelligence aggregator" of noteworthy persons highlighting their interpersonal connections. The Rotten.com domain was registered in 1996 by former Apple and Netscape software engineer Thomas E. Dell, who was also known by his internet alias, "Soylent".

Entries
Each entry has an executive summary with an assessment of the person's notability. It also lists their deaths, cause of deaths, and life risk factors that may affect their life span such as obesity, cocaine addiction, or dwarfism. Businesspeople and government officials are listed with chronologies of their posts, positions, and board memberships. NNDB has articles on films with user-submitted reviews, discographies of selected music groups, and extensive bibliographies.

NNDB Mapper
The NNDB Mapper, a visual tool for exploring connections between people, was made available in May 2008.  It required Adobe Flash 7.

See also
NameBase

References

External links 
 

Internet properties established in 2002
Databases
Online databases
Online person databases